Lucas Eduardo Lóh (born 18 January 1991) is a Brazilian professional volleyball player, a former member of the Brazil national team, and a silver medallist at the 2014 World League.

Career

Clubs
In 2011 won a silver medal of Brazilian Championship with Sada Cruzeiro Vôlei. A year later, the team has improved this result. Sada Cruzeiro Vôlei with Lóh in the team was a Brazil Champion in the season 2011/2012. In 2012-2014 played in Vivo/Minas. On June 18, 2014 moved to Polish club - ZAKSA Kędzierzyn-Koźle and signed one-year contract. In April 2014 left Polish club.

National team
In 2013 won gold medal of the World U-23 Championship.

Honours

Clubs
 CSV South American Club Championship
  Belo Horizonte 2013 – with Minas Tênis Clube
 FIVB Club World Championship
  Betim 2021 – with Sada Cruzeiro

 National championships
 2011/2012  Brazilian Championship, with Sada Cruzeiro
 2016/2017  Brazilian Cup, with Vôlei Taubaté
 2017/2018  Turkish Cup, with Halkbank Ankara
 2017/2018  Turkish Championship, with Halkbank Ankara
 2018/2019  Brazilian SuperCup, with SESI São Paulo

Youth national team
 2013  FIVB U23 World Championship

References

External links
 
 Player profile at PlusLiga.pl 
 Player profile at Volleybox.net
 2018 FIVB World Championship – Team Brazil

1991 births
Living people
People from Toledo, Paraná
Sportspeople from Paraná (state)
Brazilian men's volleyball players
Pan American Games medalists in volleyball
Volleyball players at the 2019 Pan American Games
Pan American Games bronze medalists for Brazil
Medalists at the 2019 Pan American Games
Brazilian expatriate sportspeople in Poland
Expatriate volleyball players in Poland
Brazilian expatriate sportspeople in Turkey
Expatriate volleyball players in Turkey
Brazilian expatriate sportspeople in France
Expatriate volleyball players in France
ZAKSA Kędzierzyn-Koźle players
Halkbank volleyball players
Czarni Radom players
Outside hitters